Dovhe is a village in Alchevsk Raion (district) in Luhansk Oblast of eastern Ukraine, at about 30 km WNW from the centre of Luhansk city, on the right bank of the Siverskyi Donets river.

The settlement was taken under control of pro-Russian forces during the War in Donbas, that started in 2014.

References

Villages in Alchevsk Raion